Border Life is an ITV magazine programme serving the south of Scotland.

Overview
Typically broadcast most weeks on ITV Border Scotland on Fridays at 19:00, it opts out of the national ITV Evening News.

The programme features topical stories and features from Dumfries and Galloway and the Borders. The programme has been on air since 2014 and is currently produced from ITV Tyne Tees & Border’s Carlisle offices.

Current Presenters
 Fiona Armstrong
 Sandy McCracken
 Lori Carnochan

Former Presenters
 Emma Baker
 Fiona McIlwraith

References

External links

2010 establishments in Scotland
2010s Scottish television series
2014 British television series debuts
2014 Scottish television series debuts
Dumfries and Galloway
English-language television shows
Scottish Borders
Scottish television shows